An Ansitz is a small residence designed for the lower nobility of the Germanic Alpine region.

History 
The concept of Ansitz dates back to the end of the Middle Ages up to the 19th century. Unlike castles, they were hardly fortified. They arose when medieval fortifications had lost their military purpose. Residences were designed mainly for the comfortable and prestigious living of their owners. An Ansitz was often extremely ornate in design and furnished to denote the status of its owner.

The application of the word Ansitz to refer to a noble residence is hardly used today outside South Tyrol, Bavaria, and Austria. As of 2008, there are 200 Ansitze remaining in Austria.

References 

Buildings and structures by type
Country houses
House types
Houses in Austria
Houses in Italy
Manor houses in Germany